Batika is a census town in Pandua CD Block in Chinsurah subdivision of Hooghly district in the Indian state of West Bengal.

History
Batika is generated by combining shape of some colonies. They are Purbapalli (Formerly Goalapara), Roypara and Majher para or Muslim para.

Geography

Location
Batika is located at 23.1209035 N and 88.2012919 E. It has an average elevation of 21 m ( 69 ft ). Howrah-Bardhaman Main Line passed through the edge of this town. Road density is very good here. Road conditions are excellent. Boinchi-Kalna road ( WB STATE HIGHWAY No 11 ) also passed through the edge of this town. Nearest railway station is Bainchi railway station.

Demography
As of 2011 census Batika had total population of 8717. Males constitute 50.7% and females constitute 49.3% of total population. Among total population 82.36% are literate, higher than national literary rate that is 76%. Among male population 86.61% are literate. Among female population 78.04% are literate. Sex ratio (Male:female) in this town is 1000:971, higher than national average sex ratio.

Economy
This town's two sides are covered by agricultural lands and other two sides are covered by this region's main town Boinchi.  Though it is a town, the dependency ratio is high little bit. Total working person figure is 3287. A rice mill is situating here. Very few people are engaged in agriculture. Others are either involved in service or in businesses that are totally non-agricultural.

Facilities and education
It is a settlement based town. Over 2178 houses situating here with all basic urban amenities like water supply, sewerage. Market and other services are excellent here.  Road conditions are excellent. Small-medium industries are present here. There are two schools. One is Batika Girls' High school and other is Batika Primary School.

See also
 Boinchi
 Hooghly District

References
 http://www.censusindia.gov.in/pca/SearchDetails.aspx?Id=342650

External links
 http://www.census2011.co.in/data/town/324899-batika-west-bengal.html

Cities and towns in Hooghly district